Los 10+ Pedidos (Pronounced as Los Diez Mas Pedidos [English: The 10 Most Requested]) is a television show broadcast on MTV in Latin America. It has the same concept as the U.S. MTV show Total Request Live in that it airs the ten most requested videos (voted for by viewers on the internet), and between the voted videos it shows other videos. It is believed to be one of the shows on MTVla with the highest ratings. Originally it was broadcast in an hour, then at the end of 2005 it was extended to ninety minutes, in 2015 and 2016 it lasts one hour again.

Most of the shows has VJs, the most recognized of which were Carmen Arce and Gabo in México and Cecilia Peckaitis and Jerónimo Oriana in Argentina. The physical presentation of the show, which includes images, animations and sounds, has changed on repeated occasions like cars on black and white.  During a short period of time — August to November 2005 —  some of the most requested videos were not transmitted completely; instead, short clips were aired so more videos could be shown. Some of the show producers include: Marianne Felici, Cristina Tamez Rodriguez, amongst others.

In 2009, the show had a brief replacement called Tu Top 10 which debuted the Monday following the rerun of 2008's Los 100+ Pedidos, the show suffered a mejor revamp during its absence and now there is only one 10+ for Latin America, with Gabo and Mecha hosting, the revamped show premiered April 20, 2009.

Signals

Los 10+ Pedidos Norte (TRL Mexico) is broadcast live from Mexico City and transmitted only to this country and aired the weekdays on the 3 at daytime

Los 10+ Pedidos Centro (TRL Centro Hispanic Latin America) is broadcast live from Bogota to the following countries which are part of MTV Centro:
Bolivia
Colombia
Chile
Costa Rica
Ecuador
El Salvador
Guatemala
Honduras
Nicaragua
Panama
Peru
Dominican Republic
Venezuela

Los 10+ Pedidos Sur (TRL Argentina, Uruguay and Paraguay) is broadcast live from Buenos Aires, Argentina.

VJs
Los 10+ Pedidos has had various VJs. The hosts were:

Edith Serrano – Mexico (mid 1999)
Eduardo "Pocas" Peñafiel – Mexico (1999-mid 2004)
Jazz – Mexico (mid 2007)
Habacuc Guzman – Mexico (Co-VJ 2007)
Gabriel "Gabo" Ramos Villalpando – Mexico (2004-2010) Argentina (2009-2010)
Jimmy Servant (Mexico) – Latin America (2015)
Pamela Voguel (Mexico) – Latin America (2015-2016)
Alejandro Lacroix – Argentina (1999-2001)
Sebastian "Berta" Muñiz – Argentina (2001-2002)
Cecilia Peckaitis – Argentina (2005-2006)
Jerónimo Oriana – Argentina (2007-2008)
Belén Chavanne – Argentina (2007)
Mecha Iñigo – Argentina (2008-2009)
Macarena Achaga – Argentina (2010)
Alfredo Lewin – Chile (2000-2001)
Úrsula Eggers – Chile (2000-2002)
Tonka Tomicic – Chile (2002)

Animated shorts
Broadcast in commercial breaks:

Happy Tree Friends (2004-2005)
Alejo & Valentina (2005-2006)

External links
MTV Latin America

1999 Argentine television series debuts
2000s Argentine television series
Mexican music television series
MTV original programming
Music chart television shows